The 1978 Rutgers Scarlet Knights football team represented Rutgers University in the 1978 NCAA Division I-A football season. In their sixth season under head coach Frank R. Burns, the Scarlet Knights compiled a 9–3 record while competing as an independent. The team outscored its opponents 284 to 165 and finished the season with a 34–18 loss to Arizona State in the Garden State Bowl. The team's statistical leaders included Bob Hering with 1,193 passing yards, Glen Kehler with 883 rushing yards, and David Dorn with 535 receiving yards. It was the Scarlet Knights' first major bowl appearance.

Schedule
Sources for attendance:

Source for times:

Coaching staff
Source:

 Head coach: Frank R. Burns
Offensive coordinator: Bill Speranza
Offensive line coach: James Taigia
Wide receivers coach: Dick Curl
Defensive coordinator: Bob Naso
Defensive backs coach: Pete Savino
Defensive line coach: Ted Cottrell

References

Rutgers
Rutgers Scarlet Knights football seasons
Rutgers Scarlet Knights football